Francis Campbell (born 1970) is a British diplomat and academic.

Francis Campbell may also refer to:

 Francis Campbell (cricketer) (1867–1929), Australian cricketer
 Francis Campbell (politician) (1829–?), American politician
 Francis Joseph Campbell (1832–1914), American anti-slavery campaigner
 Francis Eastwood Campbell (1823–1911), Clerk of the New Zealand House of Representatives
 Francis Maule Campbell (1844–1920)

See also 
 Frank Campbell (disambiguation)